Yrétha Silété (born 27 August 1994) is a French former competitive figure skater. She is a two-time French national champion (2011, 2012) and represented France at the European, World, and World Junior Championships. She achieved her best result, ninth, at the 2012 European Championships.

Personal life
Yrétha Silété was born in Melun, Seine-et-Marne. Her parents immigrated to France from Togo. Her sister, Yolene, is a gymnast and her brother, Yvan, plays soccer. She decided to study law.

Career
Silété began skating at age six in Dammarie-lès-Lys and worked with coach Claude Péri-Thévenard throughout her entire career.

In 2008, Silété won the national novice title. She skated in the ISU Junior Grand Prix series in 2009 and 2010; her best result was fourth at the 2010 JGP Courchevel. Later that season, she won the bronze medal at the 2010 NRW Trophy. Silété won the French Championships at the senior level, finishing first in the short program and fourth in the free skating. She was 11th at the 2011 Junior Worlds.

Following the 2010-11 season, Silété decided to turn senior. She began the 2011-12 season at the 2011 Nebelhorn Trophy, where she placed 11th. Her next event was the 2011 French Masters; she came in fifth in the short program but won the free skate to place third overall. She competed at the 2011 Trophée Éric Bompard, where she placed 8th. Silété next competed at the French Nationals, and successfully defended her title.

Silété competed at the European Championships for the first time in her career, and aimed for a top-ten finish. She achieved her goal, finishing ninth after placing 8th in the short program and 11th in the free skate. She was chosen to represent France at the 2012 World Championships in Nice. At the event, she placed 8th in the free program and 12th overall. She was also part of the French team at the 2012 World Team Trophy.

Silété received a pair of senior Grand Prix assignments, however, in August 2012, she collided with another skater while training in Courchevel and had a bad fall, suffering a torn anterior cruciate ligament and injuring her lateral external ligament and meniscus. She underwent surgery to repair the damage on 27 August and was expected to remain off the ice until January 2013 and miss the entire 2012–13 season. Recovery was a slow process — in April 2013, Silété had regained only one triple jump, the toe loop. Although she had another operation in August 2013, persistent problems led her to retire from competition on November 1, 2014.

Programs

Competitive highlights
GP: Grand Prix; JGP: Junior Grand Prix

References

External links 

 

1994 births
Living people
Sportspeople from Melun
French female single skaters
French sportspeople of Togolese descent
Black French sportspeople
20th-century French women
21st-century French women